Callopanchax is a genus of African rivulines endemic, as the name indicates, to Africa.  Some of these species are popular aquarium fish.

Species
There are currently five recognized species in this genus:
 Callopanchax huwaldi (Berkenkamp & Etzel, 1980)
 Callopanchax monroviae (Roloff & Ladiges, 1972)
 Callopanchax occidentalis (Clausen, 1966) (Golden pheasant panchax)
 Callopanchax sidibeorum Sonnenberg & Busch, 2010
 Callopanchax toddi (Clausen, 1966)

References

Nothobranchiidae
Fish of Africa
Freshwater fish genera
Taxa named by George S. Myers